Bouchard Transportation Co., Inc, based in Melville, New York, and founded in 1918, was a closely held family-owned company that provided oil and petroleum product transportation in the United States. The company operated 26 tugboats and 25 oil tanker barges.

In October 2017, one of its barges exploded off Port Aransas, Texas, killing two members of the crew. The firm made efforts to suppress a Coast Guard investigation of the accident and retaliated against employees who cooperated. The investigation indicated the accident was caused by ineffective management by the company.

The company was headed by Morton ‘Morty’ Bouchard from 1992 to March 2021. He was the fourth member of the family to lead the firm. He was removed from his position at the order of a bankruptcy court in March 2021.

References

External links
Corporate website

Bouchard Transportation Co., Inc
Companies based in Suffolk County, New York
1918 establishments in New York (state)
Non-renewable resource companies established in 1918
Transportation companies based in New York (state)